Michael Dameski (born 7 November 1995) is an Australian dancer, actor and singer of Macedonian descent.

Early career
When Michael was six years old, he entered his first dance competition "The 2001 Australian Dance Idol" Program. Without any formal dance training, Michael placed in the top ten of this competition. Following this competition, he started training at Glenda Yee School of Dance located in Casula, New South Wales. Later, Michael began studying at the Brent Street Studios in Moore Park, N.S.W. where he was given the opportunity to represent Australia in the World Championships of Performing Arts in Los Angeles. At this event, he received gold in each category he entered and overall Junior World Dancer. In 2013 he won the prestigious Australian Dancer of the Year title at the Showcase Australian Dance Championships produced by Australian Peter Oxford (founder), after which Michael went on to win the U.S. dance title Rainbow Dance in Las Vegas.
 
Dameski was a guest at the Zlatno Slavejce (Golden Nightingale) children's singing festival in Macedonia, where he recorded a song written especially for him entitled 'One Dance'.
He also premiered on World Of Dance on NBC.

Billy Elliot the Musical
In October 2008, Dameski joined the cast as one of the five Billys in the Sydney production of Billy Elliot the Musical along with Joshua Denyer, Rhys Kosakowski, Dayton Tavares and Joshua Waiss Gates. His final performance as Billy in Australia was the next to last show on 13 June 2009, in Melbourne.

Dameski departed Sydney 20 December 2009 to commence a season in the Broadway production of Billy Elliot the Musical.

Dameski left the Broadway production on 5 September 2010 to join the BETM 2nd North American Tour. He was in rehearsals with the new cast of that production in September and early October, before the tour began in Durham, North Carolina on 30 October 2010. Dameski's last performance as Billy was 29 January 2011.

Dameski was a Green Room Award 2008 joint recipient for Male Artist In A Leading Role for Billy Elliot the Musical; as well as an Australian Dance Awards 2009 joint recipient for Outstanding Performance in a Stage Musical for the same role.

Career Post-Billy
At the beginning of 2012, Dameski appeared on Young Talent Time as a guest competitor and won Heat 9, so he returned to another episode but didn't win the heat.

In February 2014, Dameski appeared on the Australian version of So You Think You Can Dance and on 1 May 2014 won the competition, crowned Australia's Favourite Dancer for 2014.
He was also an original cast member of the Dream Dance Company established by Marko Panzic.

Dameski was traveling with the first national tour of Newsies as Tommy boy and a Citizen of New York. Dameski also appeared in the "Newsies" Broadway Recording shown in theaters, and was recently taken off of Netflix. The film is now available on Disney's streaming service, Disney+

In 2018, Michael appeared on the US TV show World of Dance (season 2) in which he finished as the Runner-Up. He choreographed all routines on his own. He also appeared on The Ellen DeGeneres Show (season 15).

In 2018, Michael recorded his own video named "Don't judge me", it is a representation of his teenager life. He published it on his Instagram on September 25, saying: "As a teenager I suffered so much from judging myself constantly when I would look in the mirror. It has taken me years to overcome this feeling and I’m so grateful that I am finally beginning to feel comfortable in my own skin. The key to this is of course learning self love but also surrounding yourself with people that love and believe in you more than you ever could. To those people, You know who are and I appreciate you all so much.", choreography and idea by himself.

Stage credits

Concept videos

Personal life
Dameski currently lives in Los Angeles, California.

References

External links

Billy Elliot the Musical official site

1995 births
Living people
Australian male child actors
Australian male dancers
So You Think You Can Dance winners
Australian people of Macedonian descent
Male actors from Sydney
Participants in Australian reality television series